This is a list of awards and nominations received by Dean, a South Korean alternative R&B singer-songwriter and record producer. In 2016, he released his first EP, 130 mood : TRBL which received nominations on Korean Music Awards and Korean Hip-Hop Awards for Best R&B & Soul Album and Album of the Year, with three singles from the album receiving multiple nominations; "Pour Up" won Best R&B and Soul Song on Korean Music Awards, "21" received nomination for the same category, his best-selling single "D (Half Moon)" earned a nomination for Song of the Year on MAMA awards, and Best R&B/Soul Song on MelOn Music Awards, and won Korean Hip-Hop Awards for R&B Track of the Year.

Dean also collaborates with many artists, which has earned him two wins on South Korean music programs.

Awards and nominations

References

Dean